Leili Pärnpuu (30 January 1950 – 5 February 2022) was an Estonian chess player who won the Estonian Women's Chess Championship five times. Woman International Master (1990).

Chess career
In the Estonian Women's Chess Championship Leili Pärnpuu won five gold medals (1975, 1979, 1980, 1986, 1990), 10 silver medals (1976-1977, 1984, 1991, 1993-1995, 2002, 2004, 2009) and six bronze medals (1978, 1988, 1996, 2000–01, 2008). She played three times for Estonia in the Soviet Team chess championship (1981, 1983, 1985).

Leili Pärnpuu played for Estonia in a number of Chess Olympiads:
 In 1994, at third board in the 31st Chess Olympiad in Moscow (+1, =6, -2);
 In 1996, at third board in the 32nd Chess Olympiad in Yerevan (+5, =3, -3);
 In 1998, at first reserve board in the 33rd Chess Olympiad in Elista (+2, =3, -1);
 In 2000, at third board in the 34th Chess Olympiad in Istanbul (+2, =7, -2);
 In 2002, at second board in the 35th Chess Olympiad in Bled (+6, =7, -0) - 2nd place;
 In 2004, at second board in the 36th Chess Olympiad in Calvia (+5, =5, -3);
 In 2006, at first reserve board in the 37th Chess Olympiad in Turin (+2, =3, -2);
 In 2008, at fourth board in the 38th Chess Olympiad in Dresden (+1, =2, -3);
 In 2010, at third board in the 39th Chess Olympiad in Khanty-Mansiysk (+3, =3, -2).

Personal life
By profession Leili Pärnpuu was an economist. In the 1990s she worked in the Police and Border Guard Board of the Republic of Estonia.

References

External links
 
 
 Leili Piarnpuu player profile at 365chess.com

1950 births
2022 deaths
Estonian female chess players
Soviet female chess players
Chess Olympiad competitors
20th-century Estonian economists
Sportspeople from Haapsalu